Marina Karnaushchenko (born October 2, 1988) is a Russian sprint athlete. She was part of the Russisn team that won the bronze medal at the 2012 IAAF World Indoor Championships.

References

External links
 IAAF Profile

1988 births
Living people
Russian female sprinters
Universiade medalists in athletics (track and field)
Universiade gold medalists for Russia
World Athletics Indoor Championships medalists
Medalists at the 2011 Summer Universiade